Marcel Martel may refer to:
Marcel Martel (musician) (1925–1999), French Canadian singer-songwriter and composer
Marcel Martel (historian), French Canadian historian